Aiolopus is a genus of grasshopper belonging to the family Acrididae, subfamily Oedipodinae and tribe Epacromiini.  Species can be found in Africa (including Madagascar), Europe and Asia - through to New Caledonia.

Species
The Orthoptera Species File lists the following:
 Aiolopus carinatus (Bei-Bienko, 1966)
 Aiolopus dubia Willemse, C., 1923
 Aiolopus longicornis Sjöstedt, 1909
 Aiolopus luridus (Brancsik, 1895)
 Aiolopus markamensis Yin, X., 1984
 Aiolopus meruensis Sjöstedt, 1909
 Aiolopus morulimarginis Zheng & Sun, 2008
 Aiolopus nigritibis Zheng, Z. & S. Wei, 2000
 Aiolopus obariensis Usmani, 2008
 Aiolopus oxianus Uvarov, 1926
 Aiolopus puissanti Defaut, 2005
 Aiolopus simulatrix (Walker, 1870)
 Aiolopus strepens (Latreille, 1804)
 Aiolopus thalassinus (Fabricius, 1781)

References

External links
 
 Fauna Europaea
 Biolib

Acrididae genera
Oedipodinae
Taxa named by Franz Xaver Fieber